Macromedia Flash may refer to:

Adobe Animate, a multimedia authoring and computer animation program formerly known as Macromedia Flash
Adobe Flash, a multimedia software platform formerly known as Macromedia Flash